Patterson Township may refer to:

Canada
 Patterson Township, Ontario

United States
 Patterson Township, Greene County, Illinois
 Patterson Township, Caldwell County, North Carolina, in Caldwell County, North Carolina
 Patterson Township, Darke County, Ohio
 Patterson Township, Beaver County, Pennsylvania

	
Township name disambiguation pages